Kim Yang (Jinyang District, 808–857) was part of the Silla royal family and its retainers. Said to be a descendant of the third son of Kim Chunchu.

In service of Silla
Served as Viceroy of Silla.  Upon the death of Heungdeok of Silla in 836, a succession struggle erupted between Kim Gyunjeong and his nephew, Kim Jeryung (?–838), Ujing and his follower, Kim Yang supported Gyunjeong while Kim Myeong and Kim Rihong stood by Jeryung. Jeryung's party succeeded and Gyunjeong was killed, Jeryung becoming King Huigang. Kim Yang escaped, but Ujing did not. Following the coup and suicide of King Huigang, Kim Myeong took up the throne as King Minae. Kim Yang, who was then concealing himself on a mountain near the capital, heard the news and raised up an army to go to Cheonghaejin. He told Ujing of these events and persuaded him to have his revenge. Ujing and Kim Yang asked Jang Bogo to help him to take advantage of the confusion of the country and to make himself a king. Jang Bogo agreed and had his friend Jeong Nyeon also follow Ujing. In 839, Ujing, Kim Yang and their followers defeated King Minae's army at the battle of Daegu and quickly advanced upon the capital. All the king's aides then ran away leaving the king behind, so the king hid himself in a villa near the royal palace. Soldiers came into the palace and searched for the king. Finally, they found the king in the villa and killed him in spite of his pleas. Kim Rihong was also killed. Ujing then placed himself on the throne as King Sinmu. Known to have orchestrated Jang Bogo's assassination in 846 (or 841) through Yeom Moon, as Jang received a high position and began conspiring against the King.

Tomb
Kim Yang's tomb lies about 15 meters away from King Taejong's tomb.

Family
Great Grandfather: Kim Ju-won
Grandfather: Kim Heon-chang
Father: Kim Jung

See also
Yeom Jang
Jang Bogo
History of Korea
Military history of Korea
List of Silla people
List of Koreans

References

808 births
857 deaths